A Profecia (Portuguese for The Prophecy) is the second studio album by hip hop group Bonde da Stronda released in 2011 by the label "Galerão Records" and distributed by Radar Records. Were released as singles tracks "A Profecia", "Tudo pra mim" and "O Bagulho é muito Louco" in order to promote the album. The release date for the CD has been rescheduled several times until then be released on 2 December 2011.

Track listing

Personnel
Mr. Thug – lead vocals, composition
Léo Stronda – vocals

Music videos

References

External links
Sale of CD "A Profecia"

2011 albums
Bonde da Stronda albums
Portuguese-language albums